Valve is an American video game developer and publisher founded in 1996 by Gabe Newell and Mike Harrington. The company is based in Bellevue, Washington. Valve's first game was Half-Life, a first-person shooter released in 1998. It received universal acclaim and sold over nine million retail copies. Alongside Half-Lifes launch, Valve released development tools to enable the player community to create content and mods. The company then proceeded to hire the creators of popular mods such as Counter-Strike.

Valve continued their trend of developing predominantly first-person video games in the 2000s with a number of critically successful releases. In 2004, they released the highly anticipated sequel Half-Life 2 through their own digital distribution service Steam. The game sold over 10 million copies and was met with acclaim. Valve released two subsequent episodes for Half-Life 2 and later packaged those games together with the puzzle game Portal and the multiplayer shooter Team Fortress 2 in a collection known as The Orange Box. By the end of 2008, combined retail sales of the Half-Life series, Counter-Strike series and The Orange Box had surpassed 32 million units. Newell also projected that digital sales of Valve's games would eventually exceed retail sales as Steam continued to grow. In the late 2000s, Valve released two zombie-themed first-person shooters focusing on cooperative gameplay with the Left 4 Dead series. The company continued to release multiplayer games with the launches of Counter-Strike: Global Offensive and Dota 2, both of which have large esports communities fostered by Valve. During the 2010s, Valve began focusing on supporting their established multiplayer games with regular content updates. In the late 2010s, Valve began investing in virtual reality and started to develop games and other software that make use of the technology, such as Half-Life: Alyx.

Valve is considered one of the most important and influential companies in the games industry. The reception of their games, along with the creation of Steam, has prompted some publications to list Valve as one of the top game developers of all time and the most powerful company in PC gaming. Newell received a BAFTA Fellowship award in 2013 for recognizing the impact Valve had left on the gaming industry in producing several successful game franchises.

Games

Games published

Canceled and unreleased games 
Several games announced by Valve as being in development have since been put on hold indefinitely or cancelled.

Half-Life 

 Half-Life: Hostile Takeover: An expansion pack for the original Half-Life developed by 2015, Inc., reportedly cancelled in 2000.
 Half-Life 2: Episode Three: Announced in 2006 with a release date of late 2007, and cancelled due to scope creep, unsatisfactory internal experiments, and the desire to develop the Source 2 engine first.
 Untitled Half-Life 2 episode: Developed by Junction Point Studios and led by Warren Spector. Development ceased when Junction Point signed a deal with Disney Interactive Studios to develop Epic Mickey. Valve took Junction Point's project and passed to Arkane Studios.
 Ravenholm (also known as Return to Ravenholm or Half-Life 2: Episode Four): Developed by Arkane Studios around 2006–2007, with Opposing Force protagonist Adrian Shephard as the player character and Father Grigori from Half-Life 2 in a supporting role.
 Half-Life 3: A version of Half-Life 3 was in development on the Source 2 engine from 2013 to 2014. Valve planned to incorporate procedurally generated levels alongside a "crafted experience" so that no two playthroughs of the game would be identical. It was cancelled as Source 2 was not yet stable enough to support full-scale development.
 Borealis: A virtual reality game led by writer Marc Laidlaw in development in 2015, set aboard the time-travelling ship Borealis. It was cancelled as it failed to gain momentum.

Others 
 Untitled submarine game: One of Valve's earliest game ideas was for a submarine game, with Valve co-founder Mike Harrington seeing an opportunity to create "fantastic underwater visuals and gameplay". It is unknown whether it ever advanced beyond the conceptual stage.
 Prospero: A third-person exploration game with a science fantasy theme. The project was in development at the same time as Half-Life. Prosperos development team transitioned to work on Half-Life, which had gained more traction.
 Untitled role-playing game (I): A fantasy, action role-playing game about fairies that was in a prototype phase and cancelled prior to Left 4 Dead release.
 The Crossing: A first-person shooter developed in collaboration with Arkane Studios. The project was announced in 2007 and put on hold in May 2009.
 Stars of Blood: A space pirate game. In November 2012, Newell revealed the project's name and confirmed that it was no longer in development.
 Left 4 Dead 3: An open-world sequel to Left 4 Dead 2 that was set in Morocco. It was cancelled when it became clear that the Source 2 engine was not yet ready to support full-scale game development.
 Hot Dog: Another attempt at creating a Left 4 Dead game, codenamed so that fans would not recognize it if its name were leaked.
 Untitled role-playing game (II) – A fantasy RPG that was inspired by The Elder Scrolls, Dark Souls, and Monster Hunter series. It was at one point resurrected as a single-player RPG about the Dota 2 character Axe before it was shelved again.
 A.R.T.I.: A lighthearted voxel-based game that allowed for open-ended creation and destruction in a vein similar to Minecraft. It was resurrected as a VR game but shelved again when Half-Life: Alyx eclipsed its development.
 SimTrek: A virtual reality game developed primarily by the creators of Kerbal Space Program. It was cancelled during the development of Half-Life: Alyx.
 In the Valley of Gods: A period adventure game set in 1920s Egypt developed by Campo Santo, a studio acquired by Valve in 2018. It was put on hold in late 2019, with the designers shifting to other Valve projects.

References 

 
Valve